Každý niečo hrá is the sixth studio album by Modus, released on OPUS in 1985.

Track listing

Official releases
 1985 Najlepšie dievčatá, LP, MC, CD, OPUS, #9113 1632
 1985 Everybody Plays, LP, MC, OPUS, #9113 1648

Credits and personnel

 Ján Lehotský – lead vocal, chorus, writer, keyboards
 Milan Vyskočáni - lead vocal
 Marián Greksa - lead vocal
 Ľuboš Stankovský - lead vocal
 Kamil Peteraj – lyrics
 Ján Lauko - producer
 Štefan Danko - responsible editor

 Vladimír Kaššay - bass
 Jiří Vana - electric guitar, acoustic guitar
 Juraj Filo - sound engineer
 Igor Adamec - technician
 Imrich Diskantini - tenox saxophone
 Michaela Kordová-Šimková - design

See also
 The 100 Greatest Slovak Albums of All Time

References

General

Specific

External links 
 

1985 albums
Modus (band) albums